Justinianopolis or Ioustinianoupolis, was a town of ancient Epirus and of Illyricum, the successor settlement to Hadrianopolis that was repaired and moved by Justinian I. It was one of the cities of the government of old Epirus. The bishop's see that had been established at Hadrianopolis was translated to Dryinopolis rather than to Justinianopolis.

Its site is located near Bregu i Melanit, Nepravishtë, in Albania.

References

Populated places in ancient Epirus
Former populated places in Albania
Justinian I
Ruins in Albania
Archaeological sites in Albania